The AST/ALT ratio or De Ritis ratio is the ratio between the concentrations of the enzymes aspartate transaminase (AST) and alanine transaminase, aka alanine aminotransferase (ALT) in the blood of a human or animal. It is measured with a blood test and is sometimes useful in medical diagnosis for elevated transaminases to differentiate between causes of liver damage, or hepatotoxicity.

Most causes of liver cell injury are associated with a greater increase in ALT than AST; however, an AST to ALT ratio of 2:1 or greater is suggestive of alcoholic liver disease, particularly in the setting of an elevated gamma-glutamyl transferase.

The AST to ALT ratio can also occasionally be elevated in a liver disease pattern in patients with nonalcoholic steatohepatitis, and it is frequently elevated in an alcoholic liver disease pattern in patients with hepatitis C who have developed cirrhosis. In addition, patients with Wilson's disease or cirrhosis due to viral hepatitis may have an AST that is greater than the ALT, though the ratio typically is not greater than two.

When the AST is higher than ALT, a muscle source of these enzymes should be considered. For example, muscle inflammation due to dermatomyositis may cause AST>ALT. This is a good reminder that AST and ALT are not good measures of liver function when other sources may influence AST and/or ALT, because they do not reliably reflect the synthetic ability of the liver, and they may come from tissues other than liver (such as muscle). For example, intense exercise such as weight lifting can increase ALT to 50-200 U/L, and AST to 100-1000 U/L (and raise AST to about 4 times ALT) for the week following the exercise.

History

The De Ritis Ratio is named after Fernando De Ritis, who performed analysis on transaminases in 1957.

Mechanism

The proportion of AST to ALT in hepatocytes is approximately 2.5:1, but because AST is removed from serum by the liver sinusoidal cells twice as quickly (serum half-life t1/2 = 18 hr) compared to ALT (t1/2 = 36 hr), so the resulting serum levels of AST and ALT are about equal in healthy individuals, resulting in a normal AST/ALT ratio of approximately 1.

An AST/ALT ratio >5 necessarily involves extrahepatic tissue, as death of hepatocytes alone would produce an AST/ALT ratio no greater than 2.5.  Because the primary cause is extrahepatic, there is typically an isolated elevated AST, with no change in ALT. Common causes include bone disease, pregnancy, chronic renal failure, lymphoma, and congestive heart failure.

When hepatocellular death is increased beyond the usual "background" levels, the serum levels of AST compared to ALT tend to reflect the cellular proportions, yielding AST that is over twice as prevalent as ALT (AST/ALT >2) in conditions with chronic, constant hepatocyte damage (such as alcoholic hepatitis, hepatocellular carcinoma) and during early-stage acute liver damage (such as viral hepatitis). 

In late-stage acute liver damage, the body has had adequate time to clear AST, but not ALT, often resulting in an AST/ALT <1. Since testing typically occurs late in acute viral hepatitis, it is conventionally associated with an AST/ALT ratio <1, even though early in the disease AST/ALT ratio is often elevated. As the acute liver damage resolves, the body has more time to clear ALT, so in the absence of chronic liver disease, the AST/ALT ratio gradually returns to baseline levels.

See also
 Aspartate transaminase
 Alanine transaminase
 Liver function tests
 Elevated transaminases

References 

Liver function tests